Cover Story is 2002 American film starring Elizabeth Berkley and Costas Mandylor. It was directed by Eric Weston and released on DVD on March 8, 2005.

References

External links
 

2002 films
2002 thriller films
American thriller films
Films directed by Eric Weston
2000s American films